Jefferson Township is the name of 23 townships in the U.S. state of Iowa:

 Jefferson Township, Adair County, Iowa
 Jefferson Township, Allamakee County, Iowa
 Jefferson Township, Bremer County, Iowa
 Jefferson Township, Buchanan County, Iowa
 Jefferson Township, Butler County, Iowa
 Jefferson Township, Clayton County, Iowa
 Jefferson Township, Dubuque County, Iowa
 Jefferson Township, Fayette County, Iowa
 Jefferson Township, Harrison County, Iowa
 Jefferson Township, Henry County, Iowa
 Jefferson Township, Johnson County, Iowa
 Jefferson Township, Lee County, Iowa
 Jefferson Township, Louisa County, Iowa
 Jefferson Township, Madison County, Iowa
 Jefferson Township, Mahaska County, Iowa
 Jefferson Township, Marshall County, Iowa
 Jefferson Township, Polk County, Iowa
 Jefferson Township, Poweshiek County, Iowa
 Jefferson Township, Ringgold County, Iowa
 Jefferson Township, Shelby County, Iowa
 Jefferson Township, Taylor County, Iowa
 Jefferson Township, Warren County, Iowa
 Jefferson Township, Wayne County, Iowa

See also 
 Jefferson Township (disambiguation)

Iowa township disambiguation pages